Hjuksevelta (also called Hjukse) is a village in the municipality of Sauherad, 
Norway, located between Nordagutu and Notodden. Its population (SSB 2005) is 350.

Villages in Vestfold og Telemark